Lemonade is the fifth studio album by Mucky Pup. It was released in 1993, and was the last record for Century Media Records. This album saw the band's style change by moving away from their comedic humorous songs into a more aggressive yet melodic sound. Since Dan Nastasi and Christopher "Junior" LaPlante left the band, John Milnes moved to guitar, Kevin Powers became the band's drummer, and piano and synthesizer were added. The album also saw the return of Marc DeBacker on bass. Glen Cummings from Scatterbrain became a co-producer for the band, and also played guitar on two songs.

Track listing
"Own Up For What You Say" - 4:30
"Junkie Eyes" - 3:26
"Three Sides" - 3:37
"Beautiful People" - 3:43
"Mountain Song" - 3:07
"The T.V.'s On Fire" - 2:25
"Deja Vu" - 5:44
"Two Little Men" - 3:49
"If Wishes Were Fishes" - 4:06
"Confessions" - 3:03
"Mountain Song 2" - 2:56
"Darkwave Sleeps" - 1:54

Personnel
Chris Milnes - lead vocals, lyrics, guitar, tambourine 
John Milnes - lead/rhythm guitar
Marc DeBacker - bass guitar
Kevin Power - drums, samples, piano, synthesizer
Glen Cummings - lead guitar on "The T.V.'s On Fire" and "Darkwave Sleeps"

Production
Artwork, design, computer graphics by David Bornguesser 
Assistant engineer – Rick Deardorff
Mastered by Chris Gerringer
Artwork, design - Chris Milnes
Recorded & mixed by Ben Elliot

1993 albums
Mucky Pup albums